The Old Royal Palace (Czech: Starý královský palác) is part of the Prague Castle, Czech Republic. Its history dates back to the 12th century and it is designed in the Gothic and Renaissance styles. Its Vladislav Hall is used for inaugurations, being the most important representative hall in the country. It is also home to a copy of the Czech crown.

References 

Palaces of Prague Castle